Félix Isael González Garduño (born January 25, 1985, in Mexico City) is a Mexican professional footballer who last played for Cruz Azul Hidalgo.

References

External links
 

1985 births
Living people
Mexican footballers
Association football forwards
Cruz Azul footballers
Cruz Azul Hidalgo footballers
Club Puebla players
Liga MX players
Ascenso MX players
Footballers from Mexico City